Paul Hoffmann (20 June 1846 – 18 April 1917) was an officer of the Imperial German Navy (Kaiserliche Marine), who rose to the rank of vice-admiral.

From 21 October to 12 November 1889, he had Emperor Wilhelm II as his guest during the Emperor's Mediterranean tour visiting Genoa, Athens, Istanbul and Venice. His diary entries from that period are interesting to the study of the Emperor's personality and enthusiasm for naval matters, and for the later service of the Emperor's brother Prince Heinrich in the Mediterranean.

From 1894 to  1896 he was head of the German East Asia Squadron stationed in Chinese waters.

References

Bibliography

Vice admirals of the Imperial German Navy
1846 births
1917 deaths
Military personnel from Berlin
People from the Province of Brandenburg